Oenopota candida is a species of sea snail, a marine gastropod mollusk in the family Mangeliidae.

Description
The length of the shell attains 7 mm.

Distribution
This is an Asian low-boreal species, found off Japan at depths between 269 m and 340 m. The species was described based on a Pliocene fossil from the Sawane Formation on Sado Island, in the Sea of Japan

References

 Bogdanov & Ito, The Oenopotinae (Gastropoda : Turridae) Mollusks from the Southeastern Part of the Japan Sea [in Japanese]; The Japanese journal of malacology 51(1・2), p11-41, 1992-07
 Hasegawa K. (2009) Upper bathyal gastropods of the Pacific coast of northern Honshu, Japan, chiefly collected by R/V Wakataka-maru. In: T. Fujita (ed.), Deep-sea fauna and pollutants off Pacific coast of northern Japan. National Museum of Nature and Science Monographs 39: 225–383.
 Hasegawa, K., Okutani, T. and E. Tsuchida (2000) Family Turridae. In: Okutani, T. (ed.), Marine Mollusks in Japan. Tokai University Press, Tokyo, 619-667 (in Japanese)

External links
 Gulbin, Vladimir V. "Review of the Shell-bearing Gastropods in the Russian Waters of the East Sea (Sea of Japan). III. Caenogastropoda: Neogastropoda." The Korean Journal of Malacology 25.1 (2009): 51-70
 
 Kazunori Hasegawa and Takashi Okutani, A Review of Bathyal Shell-bearing Gastropods in Sagami Bay; Mem. Natl. Mus. Nat. Sci., Tokyo, (47): 97–144, April 15, 2011

candida
Gastropods described in 1926